Yasmine El Rashidi (Arabic: ياسمين الرشيدي;) is an Egyptian author. She is the author of The Battle for Egypt: Dispatches from the Revolution and Chronicle of a Last Summer: A Novel of Egypt, a coming-of-age novel set in 1984 in Cairo that was long-listed for the 2017 PEN Open Book Award. She is a regular contributor to The New York Review of Books, and a contributing editor to the Middle East arts and culture quarterly Bidoun. She is a contributing opinion writer for The New York Times.

Selected works

Novels

Non-fiction

References 

1977 births
Living people
Egyptian women journalists
Egyptian writers
The New York Review of Books people